İbrahim Dağaşan (born 15 June 1984) is a Turkish professional footballer. He plays as a midfielder for Kemerspor 2003.

Career
He left Kayserispor in the winter 2015.

References

 İbrahim Dağaşan Adana Demirspor’da, mavisimsekler.com, 10 January 2016

External links
 Guardian Stats Centre
 
 İbrahim Dağaşan at Mackolik

1984 births
Living people
Turkish footballers
Turkey under-21 international footballers
İnegölspor footballers
Bursaspor footballers
Sivasspor footballers
Bucaspor footballers
Antalyaspor footballers
Süper Lig players
French people of Turkish descent
Sportspeople from Angers
Association football midfielders
Mediterranean Games silver medalists for Turkey
Mediterranean Games medalists in football
Competitors at the 2005 Mediterranean Games
Footballers from Pays de la Loire